"Where Do I Go from Here" is a single released by Motown singing group The Supremes. It is the second single released from their 1975 self-titled album, The Supremes. The single reached #93 on the US Billboard R&B chart.

Personnel
Lead vocals by Scherrie Payne
Background vocals by Mary Wilson, Scherrie Payne and Cindy Birdsong

Critical reception
Cashbox published 'A disco effort from this rich vocal trust. The instruments really overpower the girls here (the mix is strictly aimed at dancers as opposed to listeners), but their able voices still shade the cut remarkably well. Disco. Flip: No info, available.'

Charts

References

1975 singles
1975 songs
The Supremes songs
Songs written by Eddie Holland
Songs written by Brian Holland
Motown singles